Burhakaba District is a district in the southern Bay region of Somalia. Its capital is Burhakaba.

References

External links
 Districts of Somalia
 Administrative map of Burhakaba District

Districts of Somalia

Bay, Somalia